Rognedino is an  urban-type settlement and the administrative center Rognedinsky District Bryansk Oblast of Russia. Population: 

Located 96 km north-west of Bryansk, the administrative center of the region, 15km north of Dubrovka railway station.

History
First mentioned in 1168, the name given by the name of Princess Rogneda sisters Smolensk (later - Kiev) Prince Rostislav Mstislavovitch.

In the village there is flax factory. Peat extraction is carried out in the area.

References

Urban-type settlements in Bryansk Oblast